Piero Codia (born 22 October 1989) is an Italian competitive swimmer who specializes in butterfly. He holds the national records in the 50 and 100 meter butterfly events (long course).

Olympics 
He qualified for the 2016 Summer Olympics in Rio de Janeiro in the 100 meter butterfly. He swam the 6th time in the heats and qualified for the semifinals, where he placed 11th and was eliminated.

References

1989 births
Living people
Italian male swimmers
Italian male butterfly swimmers
Swimmers at the 2016 Summer Olympics
Olympic swimmers of Italy
European Aquatics Championships medalists in swimming
Universiade medalists in swimming
Male medley swimmers
European Championships (multi-sport event) gold medalists
Mediterranean Games gold medalists for Italy
Mediterranean Games bronze medalists for Italy
Mediterranean Games medalists in swimming
Swimmers at the 2013 Mediterranean Games
Swimmers at the 2018 Mediterranean Games
Universiade bronze medalists for Italy
Medalists at the 2013 Summer Universiade
Medalists at the 2015 Summer Universiade
World Aquatics Championships medalists in swimming
20th-century Italian people
21st-century Italian people
Sportspeople from Trieste